Islamic poetry is a form of spoken word written & recited by Muslims. Islamic poetry, and notably Sufi poetry, has been written in many languages including Urdu and Turkish.

Genres of Islamic poetry include Ginans, devotional hymns recited by Ismailis; Ghazal, poetic expression of the pain of loss or separation and the beauty of love in spite of that pain.  and Qasida, written poetry, often translated as ode, passed on through the Arab Muslim expansion; and blank verse (shi'r musal).

History and origins
Beginning with the migration of Muhammad and his followers from Mecca to Medina (A.D. 622), also known as the Hijrah, the qasida or ode was a sharp contrast to the sacred Quran. Writers at the time of pre-Islamic poetry were considered to be lacking the knowledge and authority necessary to be writing such poetry, thus leading this period of time to be called the "Age of Ignorance". This time period caused tension amongst the early Islamic world, since the ode style of writing was seen as profane to the sacred text of the Quran.
Islamic poetry is very important and it is heritage passed generation to generation. These poems and features examine Muslim faith and Islamic culture and address important events, holidays, and occasions such as Ramadan. These poets explore a range of spiritual, literary, and political concerns from the 6th century to the present day. Also, Islamic poetry is found centuries ago. Islamic poetry is different in many ways like cultural, Traditions, Literature, etc. Hashem stated, "Islamic religious poetry has been composed in a wide variety of languages". (Deen) poetry is a very important thing in the Islamic religion because poetry has equality of beauty to the Islamic religion. Also, poetry use in many different languages around the world. Most importantly, poetry, which had once been shunned for representing the ideals of paganism, was brought into the service of Islam. Islamic art has always retained its intrinsic quality and unique identity. Just as the religion of Islam embodies a way of life and serves as a cohesive force among ethnically and culturally diverse peoples, the art produced by and for Muslim societies has basic identifying and unifying characteristics. Hashem stated, "Islamic art is a modern concept created by art historians in the 19th century to facilitate categorization and study of the material first produced under the Islamic peoples that emerged from Arabia in the seventh century" ( Deen).

Islamic poetry in different languages
In English, Islamic poetry now tends to be free-form (unrhymed). Current Muslim poets in English include Rafey Habib, Joel Hayward, Dawud Wharnsby, and the late Daniel Moore.

In Arabic poetry, the qasida (ode) is considered by scholars to be one of its most distinguishing aspects. originating around 500 bc, it is also considered to be fundamental to the development of pre-Islamic poetry. It is composed in monorhyme having between fifteen and eighty lines. The qasida contains three subtopics or recurring themes; the nasib or the story of a destroyed relationship and home, the fakhr which portrays self-praise for a tribe or oneself, and the rahil which is a journey into the desert involving camels. The qasida also involves biographical anecdotes called akhbar, which shows stories of revenge-taking and blood-sacrifice necessary to go through a rite of passage. The major components of the akhbar are the recurring themes of blood-revenge, initiated by the death of a father or loved one, and the "arrested development" of a person during their youth.
Example of a nasib poem by Labid ibn Rabiah:

The common theme of pre-Islamic Arabic poetry is the description of Bedouin life, the stories of rites of passage and sacrifice, depicted through imagery and the use of metaphors. This was mostly oral in composition until the third century.

Persian poetry originates in the modern-day countries of Afghanistan, Bangladesh, Iran, Tajikistan, and Pakistan, along with some areas in India during the tenth century. Genres present in classical Persian poetry vary and are determined by rhyme, which consists of a vowel followed by a single-rhyming letter. The most common form of Persian poetry comes in the ghazal, a love-themed short poem made of seven to twelve verses and composed in the monorhyme scheme.
The qasida is another genre of Persian poetry that depicts the themes of spiritual or worldly praise, satire, or the description of a patron. In regard to Islamic poetry, the most common form of a qasida is in the form of praise of Muhammad, along with people related to him. These religious qasidas emphasize the power and beauty of Allah from different points of views. Qasidas end in a series of anaphoras.
The use of visual poetry throughout Persian history helps readers visually understand the emotions portrayed by the poets through arranging letters and phrases in various shapes related to the message or central theme of the poem.

Bengali poetry, originating in the 15th century, depicts the themes of internal conflict with the nafs, Islamic cosmology, historical battles, love and existential ideas concerning one's relationship with society. This search for meaning that is present in most Bengali poems leads to the frustration depicted by poets through their dark and melancholy tones. Frustration is not pessimism, which according to scholars, some readers can misinterpret from the negative tones throughout Bengali poetry. The recurring theme of ideological values rather than societal ones is also present. The historical works of Shah Muhammad Sagir, Alaol, Abdul Hakim, Syed Sultan and Daulat Qazi mixed Bengali folk poetry with Perso-Arabian stories and themes, and are considered an important part of the Muslim culture of Bengal. Modern Bengali poetry is considered to be not rhetorical and romantic in composition.

In Punjabi poetry, the central theme is the internal conflict caused by worldly problems, along with existential ideas presented by the poet. Another theme present throughout Punjabi poetry is the paradoxical idea of life and how although wealth and knowledge is presented to a person, it is that wealth and knowledge that can distance them from the real meaning and truth of life. 
Punjabi poetry is written in a Perso-Urdu style with some Arabic and Persian vocabulary. The topics of Punjabi poetry range from romances to satires, because they are mostly written by villagers and those influenced by the village lifestyle.

References

 
Poetry movements